On March 8, 1838, a special election was held in  to fill a vacancy left by the resignation of Henry A. P. Muhlenberg (D) on February 9, 1838.

Election results

Keim took his seat on March 17, 1838 during the 2nd session of the 25th Congress.

See also
List of special elections to the United States House of Representatives

References

Pennsylvania 1838 09
Pennsylvania 1838 09
1838 09
Pennsylvania 09
United States House of Representatives 09
United States House of Representatives 1838 09